Albert Michael Fiorentino (February 28, 1917 – January 28, 2001) was an American football guard in the National Football League for the Washington Redskins and the Boston Yanks. He played college football at Boston College.

References

1917 births
2001 deaths
American football offensive guards
Boston College Eagles football players
Boston Yanks players
Sportspeople from Watertown, New York
Washington Redskins players